The Ministry of International Trade was a ministry of the Government of Ontario that was responsible for international trade issues in the Canadian province of Ontario. The position of Minister of International Trade in the Executive Council of Ontario (or provincial cabinet) was held by Michael Chan.

The ministry was created in 2016 from the splitting of the then Ministry of Citizenship, Immigration and International Trade into this ministry and the Ministry of Citizenship and Immigration. The Ministry of International Trade was dissolved in 2018, and its functions were taken over by the Ministry of Economic Development, Job Creation and Trade.

See also
 Minister of International Trade (Canada)

References

2016 establishments in Ontario
Ontario
Ministries established in 2016
International Trade